Stegophilus is a genus of pencil catfishes native to South America.

Species
There are currently three recognized species in this genus:
 Stegophilus insidiosus Reinhardt, 1859
 Stegophilus panzeri (Ahl, 1931)
 Stegophilus septentrionalis Myers, 1927

S. insidiosus originates from the São Francisco River basin in Brazil, S. panzeri is from the lower Amazon River basin in Brazil, and S. septentrionalis is from Orinoco River basin in Venezuela. Stegophilus species grow to between 4.1–4.4 centimetres (1.6–1.7 in) SL. S. insidiosus is a true parasite living in the gill chambers of larger fishes, including catfishes like Sorubim lima; it uses its strong teeth to bite into the gill filaments to suck the blood.

References

Trichomycteridae
Fish of South America
Fish of the Amazon basin
Fish of Brazil
Fish of Venezuela
Freshwater fish genera
Catfish genera
Taxa named by Johannes Theodor Reinhardt